Đula Mešter (born 3 April 1972) is a Serbian volleyball player of Hungarian ethnicity who won the gold medal with the Yugoslav Men's National Team at the 2000 Summer Olympics. Standing at 2.03 m, he played as a middle blocker. He was a member of the national team representing Serbia and Montenegro at the 2004 Summer Olympics in Athens, Greece.

References
 Serbian Olympic Committee

1972 births
Living people
Yugoslav men's volleyball players
Serbia and Montenegro men's volleyball players
Serbian men's volleyball players
Olympic volleyball players of Yugoslavia
Olympic volleyball players of Serbia and Montenegro
Olympic gold medalists for Federal Republic of Yugoslavia
Olympic medalists in volleyball
Volleyball players at the 1996 Summer Olympics
Volleyball players at the 2000 Summer Olympics
Volleyball players at the 2004 Summer Olympics
Place of birth missing (living people)
Sportspeople from Subotica
Serbian people of Hungarian descent
PAOK V.C. players
European champions for Serbia and Montenegro
Medalists at the 2000 Summer Olympics
Medalists at the 1996 Summer Olympics
Olympic bronze medalists for Federal Republic of Yugoslavia
Serbian expatriate sportspeople in Greece
Serbian expatriate sportspeople in Italy